The 2016–17 Primera Divisió or Lliga Grup Becier, was the 22nd season of top-tier football in Andorra. The season began on 18 September 2016 and concluded on 21 May 2017; this was followed by the two-legged relegation play-off on 28 and 31 May 2017. The defending champions were FC Santa Coloma, who won their tenth championship in the previous season.

Teams

Clubs and locations

Competition format
The participating teams first played a round-robin schedule containing three rounds with every team playing each opponent at least once "home" and once "away" for a total of 21 matches ("home" and "away" designation is symbolic as all teams except Encamp, which has its own stadium, play at several venues). The league then split up in two groups of four teams with each of them playing teams within its group in a home-and-away cycle of matches. The top four teams competed for the championship and qualification spots for European competitions while the bottom four clubs played to avoid one direct relegation spot and one relegation play-off spot. Records earned in the regular season (first round) are carried over in full to the respective second round.

Promotion and relegation from 2015–16
Penya Encarnada d'Andorra were relegated after the previous season due to finishing in eighth place. They were replaced by Segona Divisió champions Jenlai.

Encamp, who finished last season in 7th place, were originally set to compete in a two-legged relegation play-off against Carroi, the runner-up of the 2015–16 Segona Divisió for one spot in the 2016–17 Primera Divisió. However, on 20 May 2016, after the first leg, it was announced that Encamp were awarded the tie against Carroi, therefore Encamp remained in the top flight for the 2016–17 season.

Regular season

League table

Results

Championship and relegation round
Records earned in the regular season were taken over to the Championship round and relegation round.

Championship round

Relegation round

Primera Divisió play-offs
The seventh-placed team (third-placed in the relegation round) of the 2016–17 Primera Divisió, Ordino, and the runners-up of the 2016–17 Segona Divisió, Penya Encarnada, played in a two-legged relegation play-off for one spot in 2017–18 Primera Divisió.

Penya Encarnada won 5–3 on aggregate and were promoted to the 2017–18 Primera Divisió; Ordino were relegated to the 2017–18 Segona Divisió.

Season statistics

Regular season top goalscorers

Championship round top goalscorers

Relegation round top goalscorers

References

External links
  
Visualització de Partits - Andorran football league tables, records & statistics database. 
uefa.com

Primera Divisió seasons
Andorra
1